Where Were We? is the seventh album by The Lucksmiths released in 2002 on Candle Records (catalog number CAN2521.)  It is a compilation of tracks released between 1999 and 2001.

Track listing
 "The Cassingle Revival" – 3:17
 "Myopic Friends" – 1:52
 "A Downside to the Upstairs" – 3:35
 "Can't Believe My Eyes" – 3:01
 "I Prefer the Twentieth Century" – 2:58
 "T-Shirt Weather' – 2:44
 "Tmrw Vs. Y'day" – 3:07
 "Southernmost" – 2:39
 "Even Stevens" – 2:29
 "The Great Dividing Range" (demo) – 3:20
 "Friendless Summer" – 4:11
 "Goodness Gracious" – 2:24
 "Welcome Home" – 1:54
 "Mars" – 4:22

References

The Lucksmiths albums
2002 albums